Érd is a district in south-western part of Pest County. Érd is also the name of the town where the district seat is found. The district is located in the Central Hungary Statistical Region.

Geography 
Érd District borders with Budakeszi District to the north, Budapest and Szigetszentmiklós District to the east, Ráckeve District to the south, Martonvásár District (Fejér County) to the southwest, Bicske District (Fejér County) to the northwest. The number of the inhabited places in Érd District is 7.

Municipalities 
The district has 1 urban county, 3 towns, 1 large village and 2 villages.
(ordered by population, as of 1 January 2013)

The bolded municipalities are cities, italics municipality is large village.

Demographics

In 2011, it had a population of 116,510 and the population density was 632/km².

Ethnicity
Besides the Hungarian majority, the main minorities are the German (approx. 2,000), Roma (900), Romanian (700), Slovak (350), Russian (200), Serb, Croat and Greek (150), Polish (100).

Total population (2011 census): 116,510
Ethnic groups (2011 census): Identified themselves: 104,800 persons:
Hungarians: 98,053 (93.56%)
Germans: 2,000 (1.91%)
Others and indefinable: 4,747 (4.53%)
Approx. 11,500 persons in Érd District did not declare their ethnic group at the 2011 census.

Religion
Religious adherence in the county according to 2011 census:

Catholic – 36,241 (Roman Catholic – 35,197; Greek Catholic – 1,026);
Reformed – 10,218;
Evangelical – 1,375;
Orthodox – 239;
other religions – 2,890; 
Non-religious – 24,630; 
Atheism – 2,585;
Undeclared – 38,332.

Gallery

See also
List of cities and towns in Hungary

References

External links
 Postal codes of the Érd District

Districts in Pest County